CALT may refer to:
 California Achievement Levels Test
 China Academy of Launch Vehicle Technology
 Conjunctival-associated lymphoid tissue, a subtype of MALT